First Lieutenant Roberto Néstor Estévez (24 February 1957 – 28 May 1982) was an Argentine Army officer who was killed in action in the Battle of Goose Green during the Falklands War.

He was posthumously awarded the Argentine Nation to the Heroic Valour in Combat Cross that year.

His remains are buried at the Argentine Darwin Military Cemetery.

See also 
Pedro Giachino
25th Infantry Regiment (Argentina)

External links
Bio (Spanish)

People from Posadas, Misiones
Argentine people of Spanish descent
Argentine Army personnel
Argentine military personnel killed in the Falklands War
Argentine military personnel of the Falklands War
1957 births
1982 deaths